Neoplynes is a genus of moths in the family Erebidae. The genus was erected by George Hampson in 1900.

Species
Neoplynes cytheraea (Druce, 1894)
Neoplynes eudora (Dyar, 1894)

References

Phaegopterina
Moth genera